Kyrgyzstan competed at the 2022 World Aquatics Championships in Budapest, Hungary from 18 June to 3 July.

Swimming

Kyrgyzstani swimmers have achieved qualifying standards in the following events.

References

Nations at the 2022 World Aquatics Championships
Kyrgyzstan at the World Aquatics Championships
2022 in Kyrgyzstani sport